Stephanie Jo Mickelsen is an American politician and farmer serving as a Republican member of the Idaho House of Representatives for the 32A district. She assumed office on December 1, 2022.

Early life and education 
Mickelsen was born in Idaho Falls, Idaho, and graduated from Blackfoot High School. She earned an associate's degree in economics from Brigham Young University–Idaho. She is married to Mark, and they have four children.

Career 
Outside of politics, Mickelsen is a potato farmer and the director of the Idaho Farm Bureau. She was also a member of the board of trustees of the College of Eastern Idaho. Mickelsen was elected to the Idaho House of Representatives in November 2022.

References 

Living people
Idaho Republicans
Members of the Idaho House of Representatives
Women state legislators in Idaho
People from Idaho Falls, Idaho
Brigham Young University–Idaho alumni
Farmers from Idaho
Year of birth missing (living people)